The Galleria at Pittsburgh Mills, or simply Pittsburgh Mills, is a super-regional shopping center northeast of Pittsburgh, Pennsylvania in Frazer Township, along PA Route 28 near its intersection with the Pennsylvania Turnpike. The grand opening of the mall portion of Pittsburgh Mills was on July 14, 2005.

Pittsburgh Mills was conceived and originally developed by the Mills Corporation, now Simon Property Group. On December 30, 2006, Mills Corporation announced it sold its stake in Pittsburgh Mills to its partner in the project, Zamias Services, Inc. of Johnstown.  Because of this, Pittsburgh Mills is currently the only Mills-branded mall that is neither owned or managed by Simon in the United States. Vaughan Mills near Toronto and CrossIron Mills outside Calgary, Alberta, are the only other Mills-type malls that are not owned or managed by Simon. To date, it is the last Mills mall built in the United States.

It is the first Landmark Mills property to feature two full-price department stores—JCPenney and Kaufmann's (now Macy's), along with a Sears Grand store, which closed in 2015.

Although the typical Landmark Mills mall is synonymous with outlet shopping, Pittsburgh Mills is the only center to offer an entire lineup of full-price retailers that otherwise could be found in a traditional enclosed mall. The reason for this goes back to 1981, when developer Zamias Services, Inc. of Johnstown, planned to develop a regional mall on the Frazer Township site. Legal setbacks and financial difficulties had postponed the project for many years, until the Mills Corporation announced in 2002 that they would partner in conjunction with Zamias to build a retail and entertainment complex on the site.

As part of a foreclosure sale, the mall was auctioned for $100 in January 2017.

Decline 
Despite opening to much fanfare in 2005, the Galleria portion of Pittsburgh Mills would never see the success that its owners had hoped. Only a year after opening,  Lucky Strike Lanes closed, and was eventually replaced with two restaurants, Dingbats and Abate Seafood, and a banquet hall. Linens 'n Things closed in 2008, along with Borders Books, which closed in 2011.

Sears Grand, which opened with the mall in 2005, also closed in 2015, ending a 10-year run.

Starting in 2014, non-retail businesses began occupying space in the mall. These included real estate offices, armed forces recruiters, pharmacy and medical supply outlets, and fitness clubs. One of the largest non-traditional tenants, ITT Technical School, closed its location at the Galleria in 2016.

In May 2020, Cinemark Theaters announced that as part of the nationwide shutdown of the economy, it would not reopen the Pittsburgh Mills location after the COVID-19 pandemic shutdown. In January 2021, Goodrich Quality Theaters announced that they would reopen the former Cinemark in Spring 2021.

On June 4, 2020, JCPenney announced that it would close its store at Pittsburgh Mills by around October 2020 as part of a plan to close 154 stores nationwide. Macy's, Jo-Ann Fabrics, and Dick's Sporting Goods are currently the only anchor stores left.

As of February 2023, there are only about 20 stores left, including 6 major chain stores, which include AT&T, Bath & Body Works, Dick's Sporting Goods, Jo-Ann Fabrics, Macy's, Panera Bread, and T-Mobile. The food court, which once housed two full-service restaurants, a Starbucks location, 10 counter restaurants, and several push-cart vendors, is completely vacant.

Champs Sports, Claire's, and Verizon all closed in 2022.

Mall complex 
The mall complex consists of two components. The first of these, named the Galleria at Pittsburgh Mills, is the  indoor component of the complex which is divided into five themed neighborhoods corresponding to various Pittsburgh landmarks and cultural icons. One lap around the entire mall is about one mile in length, making it a popular spot for mall walkers.  Two children's play areas are also located within the center, located in the cut-through corridor near the food court.

The second component is an adjacent shopping center called the Village at Pittsburgh Mills.

In mid-April 2015 the mall constructed a Sky Trail that occupied a corner of the food court, in hopes of generating entertainment and business. The corner previously was the site of a carousel and a staging area for small pageants and school band concerts. Mall management closed and removed the Sky Trail in fall of 2017.

See also
 List of largest shopping malls in the United States

References

Shopping malls in Metro Pittsburgh
Shopping malls established in 1991
Shopping malls established in 2005
Namdar Realty Group